Hajer Tbessi (born 8 April 1971) is a Tunisian judoka. She competed in the women's half-middleweight event at the 1996 Summer Olympics.

References

1971 births
Living people
Tunisian female judoka
Olympic judoka of Tunisia
Judoka at the 1996 Summer Olympics
Place of birth missing (living people)
African Games medalists in judo
Competitors at the 1995 All-Africa Games
African Games bronze medalists for Tunisia
20th-century Tunisian women